Rashid Sweissat (May 18, 2002 - April 26, 2021), was a Jordanian boxer, and a member in the national boxing team for the youth category.

Death 
He died on Monday evening, April 26, 2021, as a result of an injury he suffered during his fight on the evening of Friday, April 16, 2021 in the World Youth Championships, which were held in the Polish city of Kalsi. 

He was later buried in his hometown Fuheis. The International Boxing Federation (AIBA) mourned his death by an official statement. 

Sweissat was knocked out in front of a boxer from Estonia in the 81-kilogram fight, and necessitated his admission to the hospital for urgent surgery.

References 

Jordanian male boxers
2002 births
2021 deaths
Filmed deaths in sports
Deaths due to injuries sustained in boxing